Meadowlawn is a neighborhood of Louisville, Kentucky centered along Dixie Highway (US 60) and Pendleton Road.

References

External links
   Images of Meadowlawn (Louisville, Ky.) in the University of Louisville Libraries Digital Collections

Neighborhoods in Louisville, Kentucky